This is a comprehensive list of The Pet Shop Boys songs that have been officially released. The list includes songs that have been performed by the band. The list consists of mostly studio and BBC recordings; remixes and live recordings are not listed, unless the song has only been released in one of the two formats. Tracks are listed as having been released on their respective albums, unless the single has no associated album. Where a song has appeared on multiple albums, the first appearance is listed.

References 

Pet Shop Boys
Pet Shop Boys songs